Borroni is a surname. Notable people with the surname include:

Corrado Borroni (born 1973), Italian tennis player
Delfino Borroni (1898–2008), Italy's oldest man, and the eleventh-oldest verified man in the world
Giovanni Angelo Borroni (1684–1772), Italian painter 
Paolo Borroni (1749–1819), Italian painter